The American Academy of Hospice and Palliative Medicine (AAHPM) is a professional organization for physicians specializing in Hospice and Palliative Medicine,  headquartered in Chicago, Illinois. Membership is open to all health care providers committed to improving the care of patients with serious or life-threatening illnesses. AAHPM has more than 5,200 members; 82 percent are physicians, 12 percent are nurses or other health care providers and 6 percent are residents or students.

AAHPM started a patient website to help educate the public on the importance of hospice and palliative care.

Background 
AAHPM was founded in 1988, with 250 charter members, as the Academy of Hospice Physicians (The Academy).  Josefina B. Magno, MD, president of the International Hospice Institute and Gerald Holman, MD, director of St. Anthony's Hospice and Life Enrichment Center met to discuss the formation of The Academy.

During the next few years, members worked to build the association by educating people on the importance of hospice care through newsletters and position statements. The Academy worked on publishing a quarterly newsletter and a physician self-study series. In 1994, The Academy was awarded a grant from the National Cancer Institute to develop a book series.

The American Board of Hospice and Palliative Medicine was incorporated by the Academy in May 1996. They offered their first certifying exam later that year. The Academy gained approval from the Accreditation Council for Continuing Medical Education (ACCME), which allowed it to provide CME to physicians.  The Academy also changed its name to the American Academy of Hospice and Palliative Medicine (AAHPM).

By the turn of the century, AAHPM's membership grew, and it secured a seat in the American Medical Association (AMA) House of Delegates.

AAHPM's strong presence and position on highly controversial subjects has made the Academy a prominent voice in hospice and palliative care. In 2003, AAHPM was able to develop its infrastructure and establish the College of Palliative Care with a $1.2-million grant from Open Society Institute's Project on Death in America.

Position statements 
AAHPM tracks critical issues and provides members with the information, tools, and training required to be effective advocates for their patients and their practice. In recent years, AAHPM has promoted policies that would increase the number of palliative medicine specialists, expand support for research, and improve access to palliative care services for patients with serious illness and their families.

Publications 
The Academy publishes a variety of resources for hospice and palliative care professionals, including: UNIPAC Self-Study Program: A Resource for Hospice and Palliative Care Professionals, Primer of Palliative Care, Hospice Medical Director Manual, and online practice tests: HPM PASS, HPM FAST and HMD PREP.

Educational offerings
AAHPM, together with the Hospice and Palliative Nurses Association (HPNA), sponsors an educational conference each year. The Annual Assembly provides disease updates and sessions on the latest advances in clinical research, cultural, ethical and legal, psychological, social, and spiritual aspects of care for physicians, nurses, social workers, pharmacists, and others who practice hospice and palliative care.

Annual Assembly Sites:
 March 14–17, 2018: Boston, Massachusetts
 March 13–16, 2019: Orlando, Florida
 March 18–21, 2020: San Diego, California

AAHPM also offers educational courses during the year which focus on topics of interest to hospice and palliative care professionals.

See also
 Hospice
 Palliative Care
 Hospice care in the United States
 Stephen Connor (psychologist)

References

External links
 AAHPM's Official Web site
 AAHPM's Patient Web site
 AAHPM's YouTube Channel

Medical associations based in the United States
Palliative care
Hospices in the United States
Medical and health professional associations in Chicago